Rovné may refer to:

 Rovné in Humenné District, Slovakia
 Rovné in Rimavská Sobota District, Slovakia
 Rovné in Svidník District, Slovakia